Susan Kay "Sue" Pitt (born June 18, 1948), also known by her married name Susan Anderson, is an American former competition swimmer and world record-holder. She lived with her parents Larry and Kay of Highland Park, NJ at the time of competition.

In 1963, Sue was enrolled at Highland Park High School. Shortly after she turned 15, Pitt set a new world record in the 200-meter butterfly (long course) of 2:29.1 on July 27, 1963, which she held until it was eclipsed by Sharon Stouder in 1964.

As a 16-year-old, she represented the United States at the 1964 Summer Olympics in Tokyo, Japan.  Pitt swam for the gold medal-winning U.S. team in the preliminary heats of the women's 4×100-meter medley relay.  She was not eligible for a medal under the 1964 international swimming rules (as they do today) because she did not swim in the event final.

At the close of the 1965 school year the New Jersey High School Interscholastic Athletic Association (NJSAA), and the virtually all-male sportswriter contingent, selected Sue Pitt as High School Athlete of the Year. Sue showed up to receive her award and was ushered to an outside lobby area. She received her award there, away from the spotlight enjoyed by the male athletes such as Joe Theismann who won the year before.

In 1966, Sue began her freshman year at the University of Vermont. She retired from swimming for a year because there were no opportunities for female swimmers there. However, once she reviewed the results of the 1967 summer nationals she decided she had a chance to make the 1968 Olympic Team. Sue transferred from Vermont to Rutgers and trained with the men's team. At 20 she became the second-oldest woman on the USA's 1968 Olympic Team and was voted team captain.

In 1973 (at age 25) Sue set a record for the 200 Individual Medley (Long Course-Meters) at the U.S. Masters Swimming (USMS) meet on June 22 with a time of 2:50.50.

See also
 World record progression 200 metres butterfly

References

External links
 

1948 births
Living people
American female butterfly swimmers
World record setters in swimming
Olympic swimmers of the United States
Sportspeople from Trenton, New Jersey
Swimmers at the 1964 Summer Olympics
Swimmers at the 1968 Summer Olympics
21st-century American women